Anne Dsane Andersen (born 10 November 1992) is a Danish competitive rower.

She won a Bronze medal at the 2016 Summer Olympics in Rio de Janeiro, in the women's coxless pair.

References

1992 births
Living people
Danish female rowers
Olympic rowers of Denmark
Rowers at the 2016 Summer Olympics
Medalists at the 2016 Summer Olympics
Olympic bronze medalists for Denmark
Olympic medalists in rowing